"The River and the Highway" is a song written by Gerry House and Don Schlitz, and recorded by American country music artist Pam Tillis.  It was released in January 1996 as the second single from the album All of This Love.  The song reached number 8 on the Billboard Hot Country Singles & Tracks chart.

Content
The song is a ballad using a river and a highway as metaphors for a man and woman who are incompatible but whose lives intertwine. The woman is symbolized as the river in that she "follows the path of least resistance" and "twists and turns with no regard to distance", while the man is "headed for a single destination".

Critical reception
Deborah Evans Price of Billboard praised the lyrics as "powerful poetic allegory at its very best". She also said that the song had a "pretty melody" and is "[q]uite possibly the best record in an already distinguished career."

Chart performance

Year-end charts

References

Songs written by Gerry House
Songs written by Don Schlitz
1996 singles
1995 songs
Pam Tillis songs
Arista Nashville singles